News HUB (formerly known as Independent News Network) is a production company based in Little Rock, Arkansas, which syndicates "localized" news programs for broadcast television stations in the United States, that have budgets limiting their ability to produce their own local newscasts.

In addition to producing local newscasts, INN also produced a Spanish language Hispanic News Network, or HNN and (prior to September 2019) INN News for national syndication.

History

Regional News Network
The Regional News Network started in 1999 and branded itself as Independent News Network. The company's first client was Davenport Fox affiliate KLJB (channel 18). INN produced a half-hour primetime newscast for that station, titled the Fox 18 Nine O'Clock News, which started on December 31 1999 until the station entered into a news share agreement with crosstown ABC affiliate WQAD-TV in September 2010.

The company started two syndicated general national news products in June 2002. "The American Times" and "INN News" were for stations and cable channels who did not want a customized news product. In October, a Montana regional newscast, Big Sky News, with some localization for five stations began.

INN began expanding into Spanish language newscast with Univision affiliates, particularly those owned by Equity Media Holdings. The Salt Lake City affiliate, KUTH, became INN's first Spanish client in February 2003. INN started Noticias Arkansas, a regional and local Spanish newscast, in June 2004 for affiliates in Little Rock and North West Arkansas.

In August 2008, INN launched Hispanic News Network (HNN) in 20 markets. At that time INN employed six on-air personnel, with the expectation of hiring 6 more by early 2009. A new studio was constructed for HNN and WMYD, the Detroit MyNetwork TV affiliate.

Latin Media Group
Regional News Network filed for Chapter 7 bankruptcy on December 31, 2008. INN was taken over in early January 2009 by LMG, Inc., part of Fusion Communications, also of Davenport, Iowa. In the transfer, INN laid off 12 of its staff of 40, and kept its client stations except for WPGA-TV in Macon, Georgia.

By November 2009, Independent News Network signed on WeatherNation for five of INN's Spanish language client stations. INN agreed by October 2011 to support Soul of the South Network's planned five hours of news per day. INN's staff was further cut to 14 in June 2013 as more client stations left the service.

Media Gateway division
By June 2015, SSN Media Gateway, LLC had acquired Independent News Network. At that time Media Gateway hired Anne Imanuel who remains one of the company’s primary anchors. 

Sarah Blakely was hired by May 2017 as anchor for the Lafayette, Indiana Star City News.

News Hub
Waypoint Media purchased Independent News Network from Media Gateway in early June 2019 and renamed News Hub. As corporate director of news, Elden A. Hale Jr. was then appointed to head the division. The national version of the newscast was dropped at the same time. After a planned sale to Standard Media Group collapsed, Waypoint announced the sale of the hub to Coastal Television Broadcast Group in July 2021.

Hispanic News Network
Hispanic News Network (HNN) was launched by INN in 20 markets in August 2008. Alan Rivera was promoted to executive producer for HNN and newscaster after already working at INN for 4 years. At launch, HNN produced three newscasts a day. At that time INN employed six on-air personnel with expectation of hiring 6 more by early 2009.

Stations with INN newscasts

English

Spanish

INN produces several Spanish language newscasts (primarily for Azteca América owned-and-operated stations run by Una Vez Más Holdings, LLC), and provides content for HNN (Hispanic News Network). INN also produces a daily national program for the HITN network.

INN also previously produced a newscast for affiliates of LAT TV, a Houston, Texas-based Spanish language television network; LAT TV folded in May 2008. The company also produced newscasts for seven Univision-affiliated stations owned by the Equity Broadcasting Corporation: KUTH in Salt Lake City, KLRA-LP (now KKYK-CD) in Little Rock, KEYU in Amarillo, WUDT-CA in Detroit, WUMN-CA in Minneapolis, KUOK in Woodward (as well as its repeaters, KCHM-LP in Oklahoma City and KUTU-LP in Tulsa) and WUVF-CA in Naples. Equity discontinued these newscasts on June 6, 2008.

See also
 News Central
 All News Channel
 Independent Network News
 NewsNet
 One America News Network

References 

Television networks in the United States
Companies based in Iowa
Television news in the United States
Television channels and stations established in 1999
Companies based in the Quad Cities
Davenport, Iowa
1999 establishments in Arkansas